Hai Rui (海瑞; born October 1985), is a professional basketball player from China. Hai is a forward and is currently on the roster of the Shanghai Sharks.

External links
 Hai Rui at sina.com

1985 births
Living people
Chinese men's basketball players
Forwards (basketball)
Shanghai Sharks players
Basketball players from Xinjiang
Place of birth missing (living people)
21st-century Chinese people